Trayon White (born May 11, 1984) is an American Democratic politician, currently serving as a member of the Council of the District of Columbia, representing Ward 8 of the District of Columbia. Before entering politics, he worked as a grassroots organizer and activist in the communities he would later represent on the Council. He won election to the Council in 2016, his second attempt for the seat held by Marion Barry until his death.

Early life
Trayon White was born May 11, 1984, in Washington, D.C. He grew up in a neighborhood in the Southeast, raised by his mother after his father abandoned the family. His family was extremely poor, and he sometimes went hungry or without clean clothes. Violence and drug dealing were common in his neighborhood, and at times he could not go outside due to the violence. In his early teens, White began living with his grandmother. He stole cars, and was arrested by the Metropolitan Police. He was not prosecuted, but his grandmother sent him to live with cousins to be raised. He spent the rest of his teen years living with them in an overcrowded apartment.

One of White's teachers began mentoring him. When the teacher died in an automobile accident, White turned toward Christianity. His grades radically improved, and he participated in student government. He attended TechWorld Public Charter School for at least one year of high school before transferring to Ballou High School, where he graduated in 2002.

White enrolled at the University of Maryland Eastern Shore in Princess Anne, Maryland, in the fall of 2002. Each week, he returned to the District of Columbia to coach sports with the Boys & Girls Clubs of America. White graduated magna cum laude with a bachelor's degree in business administration in 2006.

White then enrolled at a master's degree program in public administration at Southeastern University in Washington, D.C., but apparently did not complete his studies. (The school merged with Graduate School USA in 2010.)

Community activism
White became involved with the East of the River Clergy Police Community Partnership (ERCPCP) while in high school. He remained involved as a mentor and sports coach while in college, and joined ERCPCP as a paid community outreach worker about 2006. Interviewed by The Washington Post in January 2008, White said that a large number of his friends were robbed in D.C. in 2007, and he knew five people who had been murdered that year. "Living in the streets, you get numb to it and learn to cope with it. It's hard for me to cry when I go to funerals anymore," he said. White, who lived in the Washington Highlands neighborhood, denounced the 2007 shooting of 14-year-old DeOnte Rawlings by an off-duty D.C. police officer as "injustice."

In November 2007, White founded Helping Inner City Kids Succeed (HICKS), a nonprofit organization dedicated to helping poverty-stricken children east of the Anacostia River in Washington, D.C. White received the Linowes Leadership Award from the Community Foundation for the National Capital Region in May 2008 for his work with at-risk young people. In 2011, an editorial in The Washington Post said White's nonprofit "is doing interesting work with inner-city youth" and that White had real insight "into the problems confronted by students in Ward 8 schools". In 2017, White spoke to NPR about the ward's work on how to help finding critically missing children.

Board of Education

2011 special election
During his time as a community activist, White was mentored by William O. Lockridge, a longstanding member of the D.C. Board of Education. He also became known as a protégé of Marion Barry, the D.C. Councilmember representing Ward 8 and former Mayor of the District of Columbia.

Lockridge died of congestive heart failure on January 12, 2011. White ran to fill Lockridge's unexpired term on the Board of Education, winning endorsements from Barry and Lockridge's widow. He won the April 26, 2011, special election with 32.8 percent of the vote in a crowded field. He led second-place candidate Philip Pannell by 6 percent (although this represented only two hundred votes in the low-turnout election).

2012 general election
White's first term on the D.C. Board of Education expired at the end of December 2012, and he ran for reelection in November 2012. Once more, he faced Pannell in the general election, although this time there were no other candidates. White easily won with 73.3 percent of the vote to Pannell's 26.3 percent (a margin of more than 13,500 votes).

Tenure on the Board of Education
White helped break ground on a new Ballou High School building in March 2013. He praised charter schools for improving education, but criticized Kaya Henderson, Chancellor of the District of Columbia Public Schools, for failing to come up with a plan to improve education for children in traditional public school settings.

The Board of Education position paid a stipend (not a salary) of $15,000 a year. In late February 2014, White took a job as a supervisor in the "Roving Leaders" at-risk youth program in the District of Columbia Department of Parks and Recreation. However, city law prohibited Board of Education members from holding city employment, and White resigned his position on the Board on March 5, 2014.

First run for District Council
In April 2014, eight-year-old Relisha Rudd disappeared while her family was staying in a city-run homeless shelter. The child's disappearance created a citywide outpouring of concern. White, who had met the girl, worked with several community groups to organize three canvases of the area to find the girl (or her body). (The girl remained missing as of April 2016.)

On Sunday, November 23, 2014, 78-year-old Marion Barry died at United Medical Center, hours after having been released from Howard University Hospital. White was one of the people Barry called immediately after leaving Howard. On December 16, The Washington Post reported that White was one of many individuals contemplating a run for Barry's Ward 8 council seat. White was one of the first to file as a candidate in the special election to fill the remainder of Barry's term (which expired on December 31, 2016), doing so in late December 2014. Under District of Columbia Board of Elections rules that permit candidates to run under whatever name they wish, White asked for his name on the ballot to be listed as "Trayon 'WardEight' White". White later explained that friends began calling him by the nickname "WardEight" on Facebook, and he intended to use it on the ballot.

By the end of January 2015, White had raised a mere $2,562 in campaign donations. In comparison, LaRuby May had raised $177,405, and former Vincent C. Gray mayoral aide Sheila Bunn had raised $51,692. Despite the low level of initial fundraising, the Washington City Paper, quoting unnamed Ward 8 political insiders, said White probably shared the lead in the race with May. By the end of February, White had raised over $10,000 and had $12,000 in his campaign coffers.

On April 3, May easily won a Ward 8 Democratic party straw poll, confirming her lead in the Ward 8 race. May received 177 votes, followed by Trayon White with 79 votes, Natalie Williams with 77 votes, Sheila Bunn with 53 votes, and Eugene Kinlow with 30 votes. (All others received fewer than 30 votes.) Will Sommer, the writer of the influential "Loose Lips" political column for the Washington City Paper, observed that May's win may have indicated trouble for her campaign: May paid for a free barbecue for all comers just two blocks from where the straw vote was held, and Mayor Muriel Bowser stood on a nearby street waving a May campaign sign. However, May mustered fewer than 200 votes. Candidates Stuart Anderson and Jauhar Abraham dropped out of the race over the next four days, and urged voters to support Trayon White.

Election results
Turnout in the Ward 8 special election on April 28, 2015, was especially high, with more than 6,200 ballots cast by the ward's nearly 52,000 voters. That was nearly 75 percent of the turnout in the 2014 mayoral primary—far exceeding expectations. Preliminary election results released late in the evening on April 28 showed LaRuby May with 1,711 votes and Trayon White with 1,559 votes, a difference of just 152 ballots. Although May outspent White 16-to-1, election observers said White had surged late in the race as an "anti-establishment vote" and that he had consolidated much of his support by drawing it from other candidates in the crowded field. Will Sommer, writing in the Washington City Paper, argued that White lost the race because Marion Christopher Barry, son of the former mayor, had stayed in the race despite a floundering campaign and his candidacy had diverted votes from White.

However, with 1,031 provisional and absentee ballots yet to be counted, the District of Columbia Board of Elections (BOE) said the outcome of the race was too close to call. Under D.C. election law, voters who engaged in same-day registration, whose current address did not match the one on file with the BOE, or those who voted in the wrong precinct now had ten days to come forward and show proof of residency so that their votes would count. The Washington Post said its analysis showed White needed to win 65 percent of the provisional and absentee ballots to prevail. By May 7, with 823 provisional and absentee ballots counted, May led White by 80 votes. Two hundred seventeen provisional ballots remained uncounted, but the BOE said the deadline set by election law required voters to show proof of residency by 5 PM on Friday, May 9, to have their ballot count.

On May 9, the D.C. Board of Elections announced its final, unofficial ballot count in the Ward 8 special election. After counting 951 of the 1,031 provisional and absentee ballots, the BOE declared that LaRuby May won the election with 1,955 votes to Trayon White's 1,876—a margin of 79 votes, or 1.08 percent of all ballots cast. May picked up 244 votes (25.66 percent of all provisional and absentee ballots) and White 317 (33.33 percent of all provisional and absentee ballots cast). Under D.C. law, a winning margin of less than 1 percent creates an automatic recount, an outcome May avoided.

The BOE said it would certify the Ward 8 special election on May 14, 2015, and The Washington Post said May would likely be sworn in as a D.C. council member at that time. White said he would ask for a recount. Nevertheless, the BOE said that May would take her seat immediately and begin council work right away after the election was certified and she was sworn in. The BOE indicated that White's request for a recount would wait until the certification was made.

The D.C. Board of Elections certified the election results on May 14, 2015. May won with 1,955 votes to White's 1,877, a difference of 78 votes.

White initially asked for a recount on May 22. However, just a few hours after the recount began on May 28, he asked the Board of Elections to suspend its recount.

Second run for District Council
White spent much of the next year maintaining a high profile in Ward 8. He routinely attended demonstrations in favor of better public housing and job training, and against gentrification; visited areas where murders occurred; and led protests against Mayor Bowser's proposed anti-crime proposals. His work attracted strong support among teenagers and young adults in their 20s. On June 18, 2015, White was hired as a temporary employee in the Office of the Attorney General of the District of Columbia. He worked as a Community Development Specialist, focusing on education, engagement, and outreach to organizations and communities. His portfolio focused on at-risk youth, juvenile justice issues, combatting designer drug use, and general outreach to neighborhoods east of the Anacostia River. His employment ended on September 30, 2015.

On February 8, 2016, White filed as a candidate for the Ward 8 District Council seat in the Democratic primary. Few other candidates were expected to run in the race, and at the filing deadline White already had the endorsements of Jauhar Abraham, Stuart Anderson, Marion Christopher Barry, and Karl Racine, Attorney General of the District of Columbia. In addition to May, White faced candidates Maurice Dickens, Bonita Goode, and Aaron Holmes.

May, however, proved to be an agile fundraiser. By the end of March, May had $184,000 in donations compared to White's $12,000. May proved highly popular among healthcare companies and real estate developers, and her donation network spread nationwide.

White, on the other hand, won several key endorsements. In mid-April, 90 percent of the voting members of the progressive group D.C. For Democracy voted to endorse White. On May 14, White won the Ward 8 Democratic Party straw poll. With only 200 party members voting, White won 135 votes to May's 50 votes. Holmes came in third with eight votes, Dickens won two votes, and Goode won none. May declined to appear at the event. By the end of the month of May, White had raised a total of $31,000. On May 27, however, the editors of The Washington Post endorsed LaRuby May for council.

Days before the primary election, Vincent C. Gray also appeared to endorse White. Gray, attempting to return to the District Council by challenging incumbent Yvette Alexander in Ward 7, funded a pro-White robocall effort that called White an "independent thinker".

With the primary election just four days off, on June 10, the city's office of campaign finance reported that May had raised a total of $245,090 during the entire election season, compared to White's total of just $31,059. Nevertheless, The Washington Post declared that the race would be very tight.

During the primary campaign, White endorsed Robert White, who was challenging incumbent Vincent Orange for an At-Large seat on the Council. White and White appeared together at times when Robert White campaigned in Ward 8.

Primary election results
LaRuby May lost the June 14, 2016, Democratic nomination to Trayon White, 51 percent to 43 percent (4,272 votes to 3,584 votes).

General election
In June 2016, White endorsed a D.C. campaign finance reform proposal to bar any person or corporation from receiving a city contract with $100,000 or more if they donate to a District Council election. The proposal was one of the strictest of several proposals to address corruption and ethics issues facing the Council, several of whose members had been found guilty of ethics and fraud charges in the past several years.

On November 8, 2016, White was unopposed in his bid to win the Ward 8 Council seat, and won with 25,870 votes (93.29 percent of all votes cast).

Council term
White was sworn into office at noon on January 2, 2017.

In June 2017, White posted bail for friend and Ward 8 ANC commissioner Kendall Simmons who was arrested for assaulting his girlfriend in a grocery store. White compared Simmons to Malcolm X and said that the girlfriend's story did not match the facts in the case.

In March 2018, White organized protests against a development in his Ward. Targeting developers Bozzuto and Chapman Development, White complained that they did not hire enough local labor and contractors.

White pointed to the opening of a new Washington Wizards practice facility, the opening of a Starbucks, tax increment financing to construct a mixed-use affordable housing/hotel/office building, and the construction of a new building to replace the aging United Medical Center (UMC) as evidence of his successful first term in office. The Washington Post characterized his voting record on liberal issues as mixed, noting, for example, that he reliably supported expanding social services yet also voted in favor of overturning a voter-passed initiative to give tipped workers the minimum wage. He spent much of his time engaging in constituent service, such as distributing free groceries, attending protests, intervening with police, and distributing cloth masks during the covid-19 crisis.

Jewish conspiracy theory controversy
In March 2018, White sparked controversy by stating that the Rothschild family controls the weather. Following the response from community members and leaders, White apologized, met with Jewish community leaders, and visited the United States Holocaust Memorial Museum. During his visit on April 19, White reportedly abruptly left the 90-minute tour halfway through.

Initial post and reaction
On March 16, 2018, White posted a video on his official Facebook page showing snow flurries falling, alluding to the conspiracy theory of the Rothschild family conspiring to manipulate the weather. In his post, he stated, "Y'all better pay attention to this climate control, man, this climate manipulation ... And that's a model based off the Rothschilds controlling the climate to create natural disasters they can pay for to own the cities, man. Be careful." The comment was widely reported in Washington and worldwide media as an endorsement of an antisemitic conspiracy theory. The Washington City Paper reported on March 19 that this was not the first time White alluded to a Jewish conspiracy to control global weather. White later apologized for making the statement, and said he was working with Jews United for Justice to develop a deeper understanding of antisemitism. According to The Washington Post, several Jewish organizations in the area said they believed White's apology was sincere and that his comments seemed to have been made from a position of ignorance rather than antisemitism.

Second event
On March 19, 2018, the Council released footage of a February 27, 2018, event in which White claimed that the Rothschilds controlled the World Bank and the U.S. government. In the video, White says, "There's this whole concept with the Rothschilds—control the World Bank, as we all know—infusing dollars into major cities. They really pretty much control the federal government, and now they have this concept called resilient cities in which they are using their money and influence into local cities." Mayor Bowser, council members, and other city leaders attending the event showed puzzlement at White's remarks but did not condemn them at the time.

In an apology to his fellow council members, White explained why he had come to believe in the conspiracy theory: "Somehow, I read and misconstrued both the Rockefeller and Rothchild [sic] theories. At that breakfast, I indeed misspoke, was really misinformed on the issue and ran with false information. I think I heard other similar information before about the theory around the World Bank and put it all together."

Third run for District Council

Primary election results
White faced three challengers in the 2020 Democratic primary: former UMC executive Mike Austin; his former campaign manager Stuart Anderson; and attorney Yaida Ford. White's March 2018 anti-semitic statements were not an issue in the primary, with challengers arguing that White engaged in too much constituent servicing and not enough legislating. Voter turnout in Ward 8 dropped 20 percent in 2020 over the 2016 primary. (In what was supposed to be a mail-in election due to the covid-19 health crisis, just 3,500 mail-in ballots were requested, while 3,200 residents cast in-person votes at the three physical polling places.) White won the primary with 60.3 percent of the vote in unofficial overnight results.

Electoral results

2011

2012

2015

2016

2020

References
Notes

Citations

External links
 
 
 

Living people
1984 births
21st-century American politicians
African-American people in Washington, D.C., politics
American community activists
American conspiracy theorists
Members of the Council of the District of Columbia
Members of the District of Columbia Board of Education
Politicians from Washington, D.C.
University of Maryland Eastern Shore alumni
Washington, D.C., Democrats
Washington, D.C., government officials
21st-century African-American politicians
20th-century African-American people